State elections were held in South Australia on 8 March 1947. All 39 seats in the South Australian House of Assembly were up for election. The incumbent Liberal and Country League government led by Premier of South Australia Thomas Playford IV defeated the opposition Australian Labor Party led by Leader of the Opposition Robert Richards.

Background
The LCL won three seats—metropolitan Norwood, Prospect and Torrens—from Labor. The LCL won back rural Victoria after losing it to Labor at a by-election in 1945.

Results

|}

 The primary vote figures were from contested seats, while the state-wide two-party-preferred vote figures were estimated from all seats.

See also
Results of the South Australian state election, 1947 (House of Assembly)
Candidates of the 1947 South Australian state election
Members of the South Australian House of Assembly, 1947-1950
Members of the South Australian Legislative Council, 1947-1950
Playmander

Notes

Elections in South Australia
1947 elections in Australia
1940s in South Australia
March 1947 events in Australia